Marist Brothers Linmeyer (Marian College) is a coeducational school, pre-primary through high school, in Linmeyer, a suburb of Johannesburg, South Africa.

History 
The Marist Brothers established the first boys' school in Johannesburg on Koch Street in 1889. In 1966 the school moved from the heart of the town to the suburb of Linmeyer, Johannesburg. The primary and high schools have adjacent campuses and share the same sports fields.

References  

 Marist Brothers schools 
Catholic schools in South Africa 
Educational institutions established in 1889
1889 establishments in the South African Republic